Statistics of Division 2 in the 1956–57 season.

Overview
It was contested by 20 teams, and Olympique Alès won the championship.

League standings

References
France - List of final tables (RSSSF)

French
2
Ligue 2 seasons